Loki-Fögrufjöll (also known as Hamarinn  or Lokahryggur ) is a subglacial volcano under the Vatnajökull glacier.

The subglacial volcano is found within the Bárðarbunga fissure system, but is independent of Bárðarbunga itself.

The last confirmed eruption was in 1910 when tephra was erupted, but may also have had subglacial eruptions in, 1986, 1991, 2006, 2008and 2011.

See also
 List of volcanoes in Iceland

References

Subglacial volcanoes of Iceland